A seminary, school of theology, theological seminary, or divinity school is an educational institution for educating students (sometimes called seminarians) in scripture, theology, generally to prepare them for ordination to serve as clergy, in academics, or mostly in Christian ministry. The English word is taken from the Latin seminarium, translated as seed-bed, an image taken from the Council of Trent document Cum adolescentium aetas which called for the first modern seminaries.

In the United States, the term is currently used for graduate-level theological institutions, but historically it was used for high schools.

History
The establishment of seminaries in modern times resulted from Roman Catholic reforms of the Counter-Reformation after the Council of Trent. These Tridentine seminaries placed great emphasis on spiritual formation and personal discipline as well as the study, first of philosophy as a base, and, then, as the final crown, theology. The oldest Catholic seminary in the United States is St. Mary's Seminary and University in Baltimore founded in 1791. In the United States, Protestant institutions also widely adopted the term 'seminary' for independent graduate schools (separate from a university) to train their ministers. The oldest such Protestant seminary in the United States was founded in Andover, Massachusetts in 1807 as the Andover Theological Seminary and was affiliated with the Congregationalist Church. After two mergers and a number of relocations, Andover is now part of the Yale Divinity School, in New Haven, Connecticut.

Catholicism
Seminaries in the Catholic Church are divided into minor seminaries for teenagers and major seminaries for adults, including both college seminaries (though in the U.S. these are often called minor seminaries) for undergraduate students and post-graduate seminaries for those who already have a bachelor's degree.  There are also seminaries for older adults who are well out of school, such as the Pope St. John XXIII National Seminary in Massachusetts, and for other more specialized purposes.

All seminaries are run either by religious orders or by dioceses or other similar structures.  Often a seminary will train both that particular order's or diocese's priests and the priests of other orders or dioceses that select that particular seminary for its priests.  For instance, Saint John's Seminary in Boston, Massachusetts trains priests for many of the other dioceses in New England which are suffragan dioceses of the Roman Catholic Archdiocese of Boston. Either way, a man who seeks to enter a seminary to become a priest must be sponsored by either a diocese or by a religious order.

Often a diocese might be attached to or affiliated with a larger Catholic college or university so that the larger college and its faculty provides more general education in history or theology while the seminary focuses on topics specific to the needs of future priests, such as training in canon law, the sacraments, and preaching, or specific to the particular order or diocese.  For instance the Theological College in Washington, D.C. is part of The Catholic University of America.

Further, in Rome there are several seminaries which educate seminarians or already ordained priests and bishops and which are maintained by orders or dioceses from outside of Italy.  For instance, the Pontifical North American College, which trains priests from the United States and elsewhere, is supported by the United States Conference of Catholic Bishops.

Evangelicalism
The International Council for Evangelical Theological Education was founded in 1980 by the Theological Commission of the World Evangelical Alliance. In 2015, it would have 1,000 member schools in 113 countries.

Other uses of the term
In some countries, the term seminary is also used for secular schools of higher education that train teachers; in the nineteenth century, many female seminaries were established in the United States.

The Church of Jesus Christ of Latter-day Saints (LDS Church) hosts seminary classes for high school students ages 14 to 18, as part of the Church Educational System. Unlike use in other religious contexts, the word "seminary", in an LDS Church context, does not refer to a higher education program designed to train students that they may obtain a church-based career. LDS seminary students do not get high school credit for their seminary studies.

See also

 Consecrated life
 Bible college
 List of Eastern Catholic seminaries
 List of evangelical seminaries and theological colleges
 List of Roman Catholic seminaries
 Minor seminary
 Female seminary
 Jewish use: Yeshiva, and especially Midrasha, the women's equivalent, widely referred to as "seminaries"
 Madrasa in Islam

References

External links
 
 

 
Christian universities and colleges
School types
Types of university or college
Catholic education